Thoppampatti is a small town located in Palani taluk of Dindigul district in Indian state of Tamil Nadu. It is the headquarters of the Thoppampatti Panchayat Union in Tiruppur district.

Administration and politics 
Thoppampatti's economy is based on agriculture. Thoppampatti comes under Palani taluk, Dindigul district and headquarters of Thoppampatti block. It falls under Palani state assembly constituency and Dindigul Lok Sabha constituency.

AIADMK, DMK and BJP are the major political parties in this area.

This town also houses a police station.

Connectivity 
There are buses available 24/7 to Coimbatore, Dharapuram, Palladam, Tiruppur, Madurai, Oddanchatram, Palani and Dindigul. A nearby railway station is Palani railway station and a nearby airport is Coimbatore International Airport.

See also 

 Dharapuram
 Palani
 Palani Hills

References 

Villages in Dindigul district